Amtran may refer to:

AmTran, a manufacturer of school buses
The former holding company (and radio callsign) of ATA Airlines
Altoona Metro Transit